Stefan Pleszczynski (born in Eastern Townships, Quebec) is a Polish-Canadian film and television director, film producer and screenwriter.

Career
Pleszczynski's television credits include Da Vinci's Inquest, Intelligence, The Worst Witch, Weirdsister College, Sophie, 18 to Life, Flashpoint and the American-Canadian adaption of Being Human. He has been recently credit with directing the 19th episode in the ninth season of the show Supernatural. The episode was aired on 22 April 2014. The plot of this episode revolves around the supernatural entity - Vampires, which also happen to be the main entities in Pleszczynski's show Being Human.

Pleszczynski has also directed the television films Live Once, Die Twice (2006) starring Kellie Martin, Circle of Friends (2006) starring Julie Benz and A Life Interrupted (2007) starring Lea Thompson.

Prior to directing, Pleszczynski was a location manager on the films Squanto: A Warrior's Tale (1994) and Johnny Mnemonic (1995).

Education and personal life
Pleszczynski is an alumnus of Concordia University and Simon Fraser University. He currently lives in Montreal and is married to screenwriter Bernadette Gogula. Gogula co-wrote with Pleszczynski, the 2004 French-language feature film L'espérance, Pleszczynski's first full-length film.

References

External links

Film directors from Quebec
Film producers from Quebec
Canadian male screenwriters
Canadian television directors
Canadian people of Polish descent
Concordia University alumni
Living people
People from Estrie
Simon Fraser University alumni
Year of birth missing (living people)
20th-century Canadian screenwriters
20th-century Canadian male writers
21st-century Canadian screenwriters
21st-century Canadian male writers
Canadian television writers